Harry Spencer Davis (born 24 September 1991) is an English professional footballer who plays as a centre back for AFC Fylde. Davis has previously played for Crewe Alexandra, St Mirren, Grimsby Town, Morecambe and Scunthorpe United. Early in his career, he was loaned by Crewe to Nantwich Town, Stafford Rangers and Curzon Ashton.

Career

Crewe Alexandra
Davis was born in Burnley, Lancashire. After progressing through the club's academy, he made his first-team debut for Crewe Alexandra on 8 May 2010, in a 1–0 defeat to Bradford City on the final day of the 2009–10 season. Before making his Crewe debut he enjoyed a short loan spell at Northern Premier League Premier Division team Nantwich Town. He was given his first professional contract in May 2010. In August 2010 he joined Stafford Rangers of the Conference North on a one-month loan, along with teammate Kelvin Mellor.
His second game for the club came on the final day of the following season, also against Bradford. Crewe won the game 5–1 at Valley Parade.

He started in the first game of the following season, a 3–0 defeat away to Swindon Town. He began to feature regularly under manager Dario Gradi and scored his first goal for the club in a 3–1 defeat to Southend United on 8 October 2011. A few games later he scored in a 1–0 away win to Cheltenham Town. On 10 November 2011, Gradi stepped down as manager of Crewe, with Harry's father Steve Davis taking over as manager. After scoring penalties in a 1–0 win against Bradford, a 3–0 win against Bristol Rovers and in a 1–1 draw against Rotherham United, Davis helped Crewe to reach the 2012 League Two play-off Final at Wembley Stadium, which Crewe won 2–0 against Cheltenham and were promoted to League One. The following year, he was part of Crewe's winning side in the 2013 Football League Trophy Final at Wembley.

In January 2015, Davis signed a 2½-year contract to remain at Crewe. He was announced as club captain for the 2015–16 season. At the end of this contract, Crewe announced that Davis had been released by the club.

St Mirren
On 31 January 2017, Davis signed on loan with Scottish Championship side St Mirren until the end of the 2016–17 season, and scored on his debut in a 2–2 draw at Dumbarton. Davis suffered a knee injury in St Mirren's 3–2 win over Dundee United in the Scottish Championship on 15 March 2017, after scoring his third goal for the club, and was set to return to Crewe for treatment.

He signed on a permanent basis with St Mirren on 1 August 2017. Davis helped St Mirren win the 2017–18 Scottish Championship, but decided to leave at the end of the season for family reasons.

Grimsby Town
Davis signed an initial one-year-deal with EFL League Two side Grimsby Town on a free transfer on 7 June 2018. He was released by Grimsby Town on 21 May 2020.

Morecambe
Davis signed for Morecambe on 2 August 2020 on a one-year deal following his release from Grimsby Town.

Scunthorpe United
On 30 June 2021, Davis joined League Two side Scunthorpe United on a one-year deal, making 17 appearances and scoring twice.

AFC Fylde
On 28 January 2022, Davis joined National League North side AFC Fylde on a free transfer.

Style of play
Throughout his career, Davis is noted as a centre back and can also play as a right back, he established himself as a full back at Crewe in the 2011–12 season under Dario Gradi.

Personal life
Harry Davis's playing career at Crewe coincided with his father, Steve's managerial roles at the club. Steve Davis was assistant manager at Crewe as Harry made his debut, later (November 2011) becoming manager. When Steve Davis was sacked in January 2017, Harry Davis sought a loan move away from the club.

Harry's younger brother, Joe, was a defender at Port Vale, having previously been at Port Vale (first spell), Leicester City and Fleetwood Town. On 22 February 2014, for 33 minutes of a match at Port Vale, the two brothers played on opposite sides against each other.

Career statistics

Honours
Crewe Alexandra
Football League Two play-offs: 2012
Football League Trophy: 2012–13

St Mirren
Scottish Championship: 2017–18

Morecambe
EFL League Two play-offs: 2021

References

External links
Profile  at the Grimsby Town F.C. website

1991 births
Living people
Footballers from Burnley
English footballers
Association football defenders
Crewe Alexandra F.C. players
Nantwich Town F.C. players
Stafford Rangers F.C. players
Curzon Ashton F.C. players
St Mirren F.C. players
Grimsby Town F.C. players
Morecambe F.C. players
Scunthorpe United F.C. players
AFC Fylde players
Northern Premier League players
National League (English football) players
English Football League players
Scottish Professional Football League players